The 1989 Copa Interamericana was the 12th. edition of the Copa Interamericana. The final was contested by Colombian club Atlético Nacional (champion of 1989 Copa Libertadores) and Mexican club Club Universidad Nacional (mostly known as "UNAM", winner of 1989 CONCACAF Champions' Cup). The final was played under a two-leg format in July–August 1990. 

The first leg was held in Atanasio Girardot Stadium in Medellín, where Atlético beat UNAM 2–0. The second leg was played at Estadio Olímpico Universitario in Mexico City, where Atlético easily defeat the Pumas with a conclusive 4–1. Thus, the Colombian side won their first Copa Interamericana trophy.

Qualified teams

Venues

Match details

First Leg

Second Leg

References

Copa Interamericana
i
i
i
i